Absolutely Productions is a television production company formed in 1988 by Morwenna Banks, Jack Docherty, Moray Hunter, Pete Baikie, John Sparkes, and Gordon Kennedy, all of whom were the cast of British television comedy sketch show Absolutely.

Productions
 Absolutely
 Mr. Don and Mr. George
 Trigger Happy TV
 Meg and Mog
 Stressed Eric
 Deadsville
 The Creatives
 Armstrong and Miller
 Barry Welsh Is Coming
 Jeff Global's Global Probe
Very Old Pretenders

References

External links 
 Absolutely Productions Ltd

Mass media companies established in 1988
Television production companies of the United Kingdom